Morton High School is the four year public high school of Morton Community Unit School District 709 in Morton, Illinois.

Band
The Morton High School marching band has become very well known regionally in recent years.  The marching band website reports they have done well, both in local competitions and in national competitions sponsored by the Bands of America association.  The high school band was also invited to play at the inauguration of the 44th President of the United States, Barack Obama, becoming the first band in central Illinois history do so.  The high school also hosts a band invitational that ran for the thirteenth year in September, 2018. The band competes at the State of Illinois Invitational Marching Band Championship, where it has won Class 2A since 2005. In 2010, the band placed 3rd in Class AA at the Bands of America Grand National Championships and advanced to national semifinals for the first time. In 2012, the band received the honor of being class 2A champions in the St. Louis Super Regional, and performed during halftime of a St. Louis Rams and Green Bay Packers game on October 21.

The band has been the recipient of many honors and awards, including:
 2005, 2006, 2007, 2008, 2009, 2010, 2011, 2012, 2013, 2014, 2015, 2016, 2017, 2018, 2019, 2021 Illinois State University Invitational Marching Championships Class 2A Champions
 2010, 2011, 2013, 2014, 2016 University of Illinois Grand Champions - Governor's Trophy
 2012 Bands of America St. Louis Super Regional Class 2A Champions
 2010 Bands of America Grand National Semifinalist and 3rd in the nation in Class 2A
 2008, 2012, 2017, 2018 Bands of America St. Louis Super Regional Finalist
 2017 Bands of America Toledo Regional Finalist
 Recipients of the Sudler Shield Award (2017), "an international award recognizing high school, youth, and international marching bands of world class excellence" from the John Philip Sousa Foundation.
 2018, 2021 Bands of America Grand National Semifinalists
 2021 Bands of America Iowa Regional Finalist, placing 2nd place in finals. The highest ranking the band has placed in a BOA finals.

Math Team
The Morton High School Math Team won the 2012 State Math Championship at the University of Illinois in Urbana-Champaign over the incumbent University of Chicago Lab School.

Campus
The building housing Morton High School was built in three stages between 1954 and 1976. Additionally, a 450-seat arts theater, the Bertha Frank Performing Arts Center, was built in 1997.

Athletics
The school competes as a 2A team in the Illinois High School Association. Its team name is the Potters.

State titles

Bass fishing: 2012–13
Boys' Baseball: 1983–84 (2A), 2017–18
Boys' Golf: 2014–15 (2A), 2015–16 (2A)
Girls' Basketball: 2014–15, 2015–16, 2016–17, 2018–19

References

External links
Morton High School — official site

Buildings and structures completed in 1976
Public high schools in Illinois
Schools in Tazewell County, Illinois
1904 establishments in Illinois